Eva Auld Watson (1888 – December 16, 1948) was an American painter, printmaker, muralist, illustrator and bookbinder.

Biography 
Eva Auld Watson was born as Eva Auld on a cattle ranch in Bandera, Texas in 1899. She attended the Pratt Institute where she attended classes of Ernest W. Watson whom she married on June 21, 1911 in Pittsburgh Pennsylvania. They had two sons, Lyn (Merlin) Auld Watson and painter Aldren Auld Watson (1917-2013).

Watson's prints were highly stylized and studied, developed and used similar blockprinting techniques to Ernest. In 1940, she illustrated Chuck Martinez by Priscilla Horton which was published by Longmans, Green and Company. Watson exhibited work at the 1915 Panama Pacific International Exposition, the Indianapolis Museum of Art and the U.S. National Museum, Smithsonian Institution.

She died in New York City on December 16, 1948.

References 

1888 births
1948 deaths
20th-century American painters
20th-century American women artists
People from Bandera, Texas
20th-century American printmakers
Painters from Texas
American muralists
Women muralists
American women illustrators
Bookbinders
American women printmakers